Andrea Portes is an American novelist. Her novels include: Hick, Bury This, Anatomy of a Misfit, The Fall of Butterflies, This is Not a Ghost Story, Liberty, Henry and Eva and The Castle on the Cliff, Henry and Eva and the Famous People Ghosts and the upcoming literary fiction novels A Terrible Place for Murders and They Were Like Wolves.

Portes was raised in rural Nebraska, in a dilapidated farmhouse outside of Lincoln. She later attended Bryn Mawr College. After graduation, Portes moved to the neighborhood of Echo Park in Los Angeles. She has lived ever since on the east side in Echo Park, Silver Lake and Los Feliz.

In 2007, Portes published her debut novel Hick, which was an instant best seller.  After the book's success, the movie adaptation of Hick went into production in 2011. The film, starring Chloë Grace Moretz, Alec Baldwin, Eddie Redmayne, Juliette Lewis and Blake Lively premiered at the Toronto International Film Festival in 2011.

Portes' second novel, Bury This, was published in January 2014 by Counterpoint Press's imprint Soft Skull Press. The novel has been optioned and is currently in development.

Portes' third novel,Anatomy of a Misfit, was published in September 2014 by HarperCollins. In July 2014, the book was optioned in a pre-emptive deal by Paramount Pictures.

In winter 2015, Portes' spy series, Liberty, was bought in a three-book deal by HarperCollins. Twentieth Century Fox - Fox 2000 acquired the rights and will be producing with Wyck Godfrey and TEMPLE HILL. Liberty, was published by HarperCollins in 2017.

Portes' fourth novel, The Fall of Butterflies, was released in May 2016.

Portes also chose HarperCollins  to publish Henry & Eva and the Castle on the Cliff., The second in the series, Henry & Eva and the Famous People Ghosts was published October 2019.

During the pandemic, Portes' standalone novel This is Not a Ghost Story was released to critical acclaim and immediately optioned by Stone River Pictures. The rest of the pandemic consisted of Portes writing her next two upcoming literary fiction novels:  A Terrible Place for Murders and  They Were Like Wolves.

In 2023, with HarperCollins, Portes will publish the first of a yet untitled YA Fantasy Series. Her literary fiction novel  A Terrible Place for Murders has a pub date of 2024. Her next literary fiction  They Were Like Wolves has a pub date of 2025.

References

Living people
21st-century American novelists
American women novelists
American women screenwriters
Bryn Mawr College alumni
21st-century American women writers
Screenwriters from Nebraska
Year of birth missing (living people)
21st-century American screenwriters